The Former Residence of Soong Ching Ling is a museum in the Shichahai area of Beijing, China, and once was the last residence of Soong Ching-ling, the wife of Sun Yat-sen and later Vice-President and Honorary President of the People's Republic of China in 1981. The museum opened in 1982, was renovated in 2009, and is dedicated to her memory.

History

The site was once a garden used by princes and nobles of the Qing dynasty; the compound contains buildings that date back to the reign of the Kangxi Emperor and displays flowers and trees, ponds, and rockeries. In 1888, Empress Dowager Cixi granted the site to Prince Chun Yixuan, the father of the Guangxu Emperor. The residence was later used by Yixuan's son, Zaifeng, who was the father of Puyi, the Last Emperor. A Greek captain added a two-story mansion in the 1920s. After the establishment of the People's Republic of China in 1949, Premier Zhou Enlai suggested that the property might be suitable for Soong Ching-ling. Soong moved into the residence in 1963 and lived there until her death in 1981.

Exhibits
The property occupies an area of about 20,000 m2 presenting landscape consist of gardens with ponds. The mansion shows exhibits that relate to Soong's life. Documents and photographs show her childhood, student years, marriage, and political activities as interpreted through the official view. Another exhibit depicts her life and her decision to support the communist cause. Her love of the children of China is represented by another exhibit. The compound also contains her living quarters that include a number of rooms with the personal furniture and appointments as used by Soong such as her study, dining room and bedroom.

Since its inception the museum has been visited by more than 3.5 million people (2010).

Other residencies
Soong's former residence in Shanghai has been also converted into a museum in her memory named Soong Ching Ling Memorial Residence.

See also
Prince Gong Mansion

References

External links
Pictures of Soong Ching-ling's Residence

Soong Ching-ling
Xicheng District
Museums established in 1982
1982 establishments in China
Museums in Beijing
Houses in Beijing
Historic house museums in China
Biographical museums in China
Women's museums in China
Major National Historical and Cultural Sites in Beijing